Jarvis Theodore Roosevelt Catoe (October 6, 1905 – January 15, 1943), sometimes referred to as the D.C. Strangler, was an American serial killer.

Born in South Carolina on October 6, 1905, Catoe was the oldest of eight children and the son of a preacher. He reportedly acted normal until he sustained a head injury in 1925. Afterwards he began to show odd behavior, and is believed to have killed his first victim just four years later. Catoe was twice arrested for exposing himself in public, and racked up numerous arrests for traffic violations. Between 1935 and 1941, Catoe is believed to have raped and murdered at least eight women, and for the latter of the crimes he was executed via the electric chair.

While the true number of Catoe's victims is unknown, it is speculated that he could be responsible for numerous murders in the D.C. area after moving there in 1929 to live with his brother. According to Catoe himself, his  was to visit landladies posing as a handyman, and once they took him to a room to do work he would strangle them to death.

See also 
 List of serial killers in the United States

References

External links 
 Negro Confesses to Series of Sex-Slayings in east
 Rapist-Slayer Held For Jury
 Catoe v. United States

1905 births
1943 deaths
20th-century executions of American people
20th-century executions by the District of Columbia
American male criminals
American murderers of children
American rapists
Criminals from South Carolina
Executed American serial killers
Executed people from South Carolina
Male serial killers
People convicted of murder by District of Columbia
People executed by the District of Columbia by electric chair